The Whispering Shadow is a 1933 American pre-Code serial film directed by Colbert Clark and Albert Herman and starring Béla Lugosi in his first of five serial roles. Lugosi received $10,000, the highest known salary of his career, for this film. The serial was filmed in 12 days and was the last role for actor Karl Dane.

Plot
The Shadow in The Whispering Shadow is an underworld mastermind.  He has invented a device that allows him to kill by radio control. He, along with several other persons, seeks the Czar's jewels. The series is notable for the constant false clues and decoy actions that make nearly everybody a suspect.

Cast

Production
The cinematography mimicked that of Karl Freund in Universal's Dracula - for example, using close ups of the actors' eyes - in order to take advantage of Bela Lugosi's fame as the star of that film. The shadow of The Shadow is not real; It was drawn in later by animators. Harmon and Glut comment on that "If Street & Smith, owners of the original [The] Shadow of magazine and radio fame, had found out about the owner of the whisper, they might have sued."
The serial was later edited down to a feature-length edition (as was common in those days).

Chapter titles

 The Master Magician
 The Collapsing Room
 The All-seeing Eye
 The Shadow Strikes
 Wanted for Murder
 The Man Who Was Czar
 The Double Doom
 The Red Circle
 The Fatal Secret
 The Death Warrant
 The Trap
 King of the WorldSource:

See also
 Béla Lugosi filmography
 List of film serials
 List of film serials by studio

References

External links
 
 

1933 films
1933 drama films
1930s thriller drama films
American black-and-white films
1930s English-language films
Mascot Pictures film serials
American thriller drama films
1930s American films